Maumaupaki is a mountain in New Zealand 819 m (2687 ft.) above sea level in the North Island.

It is in the Coromandel Range on the Coromandel Peninsula.

References 

Mau
Coromandel Peninsula